Azaka-Tonnerre (also Azaca or Azacca) is a loa of thunder in Vodou, especially in Haiti. He is in the same "family" as Azaka Medeh, the loa of harvest.

References

Haitian Vodou gods
Thunder gods